The BSA Lightning is a British BSA 650 cc-class motorcycle made in Birmingham between 1965 and 1972.

Development
The BSA Lightning was designed as the all-round sports machine of the 1960s, planned largely for export to the US market  to complement the touring Thunderbolt and the later development, the supersports Spitfire. Development of the engine aimed to make it more reliable, quieter and less prone to oil leaks, with top speed sacrificed to improve mid-range and rideability. Nevertheless, with twin carburettors the A65L could still reach . Improvements included an oil pressure warning light, but this had a tendency to malfunction, so riders learned to ignore it.

A close ratio gearbox combined with a high lift camshaft made for lively acceleration and performance at higher rpm than the standard A65. Above 5000 rpm customers also complained about excessive vibration, with a tendency to weave above .

A useful feature was an 'emergency starting' key position for times when the battery was flat to connect the alternator current directly to the ignition coils.

From 1969 the Lightning was improved with balanced exhaust pipes, redesigned silencer-internals, widened crankcase-half mating faces and a twin leading shoe front brake. When road testing, Motorcycle Sport found the natural cruising speed to be , but was impossible to ride comfortably at more 5,500 rpm in the higher gears due to severe vibration, with 6,200 revs repeatedly breaking the headlamp bulb filament; accordingly no top speed runs were attempted.

In 1971, 201 750cc versions, designated the A70L, were also produced for American racing homologation purposes.

In 1972 the BSA Group were in financial difficulties and, in a last attempt to extend the brand life, a new frame was developed for the A65L. As well as raising the seat height to an impractical , it actually broke during testing at the Motor Industry Research Association (MIRA) test track, marking the end of one of the most successful range of British twin cylinder motorcycles.

A70 Lightning
To produce a 750cc machine for AMA Class C racing, BSA lengthened the stroke of Lightning's crankshaft by 11mm to give a displacement of 751cc. 202 A70 Lightning machines were produced to meet the minimum production requirements. All were exported to the US, most to the East Coast distributor in Baltimore.

James Bond film Thunderball 
A fully faired gold-painted BSA Lightning fitted with missiles appeared in the 1965 James Bond film Thunderball, ridden by former road-race champion Bill Ivy as a stunt double, wearing a blonde wig to make him look like Bond girl Fiona Volpe, played by Italian actress Luciana Paluzzi. Volpe used the BSA to fire two rocket missiles and destroy Count Lippe's car, which was chasing Bond.

A working missile launching system was fitted to the motorcycle but the explosion which destroyed the car was actually detonated remotely by stunt coordinator Bob Simmons. The filming of the scene was recorded in a Ford Motor Company film A Child's Guide to Blowing Up a Motor Car that is on the Ultimate DVD edition of Thunderball.

In September 1965, the actual bike was exhibited at a Brighton motorcycle show held at the Metropole Hotel exhibition centre.

See also
BSA Lightning Clubman
 Birmingham Small Arms Company

References

External links

BSA Lightning still #1 from if.... movie Retrieved 2014-05-06 
BSA Lightning still #2 from if.... movie Retrieved 2014-05-06

Lightning
Standard motorcycles
Motorcycles introduced in 1965
Motorcycles powered by straight-twin engines